Eemeli Niko Antero Salomäki (born 11 October 1987 in Turku) is a Finnish pole vaulter.

He competed at the World Junior Championships in 2006 and at the World Championships in 2009 without reaching the final.

His personal best vault is 5.60 metres, achieved in August 2009 in Espoo.

In the 2010 season he equalled his personal best mark at the 2010 European Athletics Championships, but this mark was not enough to gain him qualification into the final. He focused on the Finnish Elite Games meeting series that summer and placed third overall in the jackpot rankings after winning the Joensuu meet.

Achievements

References

1987 births
Living people
Sportspeople from Turku
Finnish male pole vaulters